Richard Boyd Barrett (born 6 February 1967) is an Irish People Before Profit–Solidarity politician who has been a Teachta Dála (TD) for the Dún Laoghaire constituency since the 2011 general election. Boyd Barrett is a former member of Dún Laoghaire–Rathdown County Council. He is also chair of the Irish Anti-War Movement and has been cited on war issues in the Irish media.

Family and education
Richard Boyd Barrett was adopted as a baby. He was raised as a Roman Catholic in Glenageary, County Dublin, by his parents, David Boyd Barrett, an accountant, and his wife, Valerie. He attended St Michael's College in Dublin. He holds a master's degree in English literature from University College Dublin.

His birth mother is Sinéad Cusack, with whom he was later reunited in public. The Cusack-Boyd Barrett connection was revealed to the public in the last week of Boyd Barrett's unsuccessful attempt to be elected to the Dáil, at the 2007 general election; Cusack, a vocal opponent of the Iraq War, canvassed for him. Political commentators incorrectly claimed that Boyd Barrett had leaked his connection with Cusack for political gains; it was actually a meeting of Sunday Independent journalist Liam Collins and the same newspaper's security correspondent Jim Cusack that led to its publication. While both were dining out in Dún Laoghaire, the security correspondent mentioned to Collins: "I heard Sinéad Cusack is his mother". Collins had political reporter Daniel McConnell call Boyd Barrett to ask him. Boyd Barrett asked that it not be published as it was private family information that had nothing to do with his role as a public representative, though, when it was, his mother was then in a position to campaign for him. Since their reunion, Boyd Barrett has had a good relationship with Cusack, her husband Jeremy Irons, and his half-brothers, Sam and Max. In May 2013, he revealed that theatre director Vincent Dowling was his biological father.

Political career

Local politics
Boyd Barrett contested the 2004 local elections for Dún Laoghaire–Rathdown County Council. He was not elected and received 1,439 votes (7.4% of the poll). In 2009, he was elected to Dún Laoghaire-Rathdown County Council, winning 22.8% of the vote and topping the poll.

National politics

Boyd Barrett stood in the Dún Laoghaire constituency at the 2002 general election for the Socialist Workers Party and at the 2007 general election for the People Before Profit. This switch of identification was intended to increase his support from non-socialist voters. In the run-up to the election in 2007 he participated in high-profile campaigns against high-rise development, bin and water charges, privatisation of hospitals and support for the Rossport Five. Boyd Barrett lost to Ciarán Cuffe of the Green Party, by 9,910 votes to 7,890 votes on the 10th count.

Boyd Barrett again contested the Dún Laoghaire constituency at the 2011 general election as part of the United Left Alliance. On the ballot paper, Boyd Barrett was named a member of People Before Profit, because the United Left Alliance had not yet been registered as a political party.

He was elected on the 10th count without reaching the quota. This followed a "nail-biting two days" of counting and recounting votes.

Dáil Éireann
As a TD, Boyd Barrett, supported protests against cuts to Dublin Bus services, saying that "Some of the older and disabled people are literally prisoners in their homes now as a result of the cut or discontinuation of the service they previously relied on". In Dáil Éireann, he condemned the 2011 murder of PSNI officer Ronan Kerr as "an utterly brutal action, which leads back down a road which has failed". He drafted the text of the first Private Members' motion which suggests there is an "overwhelming democratic case" for putting the EU-IMF bank bailout to a referendum of the Irish people. He also committed to facilitating the nomination of Senator David Norris, for a place on the ballot paper ahead of the 2011 presidential election, and welcomed the release of Teresa Treacy, who was imprisoned for contempt of court over a land development dispute with the ESB and Eirgrid. Marie O'Halloran in The Irish Times described his "consistently passionate outrage and opposition to the Government's handling of the financial and banking crisis."

Boyd Barrett spoke at the Dublin location of the 15 October 2011 global protests, inspired by the Spanish "Indignants" and the Occupy Wall Street movements. The same month he said Enda Kenny's government was engaging in "spin and disingenuity" to cover up its austerity policies, decrying the closure of hospital emergency departments around the country for "health and safety" reasons.

On 2 November 2011, Boyd Barrett led the United Left Alliance TDs out of the Dáil, in protest against the government's decision not to hold a debate on the payment of more than €700 million to Anglo Irish Bank bondholders. "You will not even give the parliament the right to vote on the handover of all the money you have taken out of the health service", he objected. On 15 December 2011, he helped launch a nationwide campaign against a proposed household charge being brought in as part of the 2012 Irish budget.

The Phoenix reported that, after a Technical group meeting with the Troika on 17 January 2012, another member of the Technical Group, Mick Wallace, confronted Boyd Barrett and angrily criticized him for "ignoring their advance strategy of dividing up questions between them and dominating the meeting with a raft of his own queries and assertions. Boyd Barrett was part of an Oireachtas delegation that met the Bundestag's Budgetary and European Affairs committees in Berlin, in late January 2012.

In October 2012, he confirmed that he had claimed €12,000 in 2011 expenses for travelling to the Dáil from his home in Glenageary, in his Dún Laoghaire constituency – a distance of 12 km.

On 10 March 2016, at the first sitting of the 32nd Dáil, he was one of four candidates nominated for the position of Taoiseach, all of whom failed to reach a majority. Ruth Coppinger nominated Boyd Barrett for the role, quoting James Connolly from a hundred years previously when she said: "The day has passed for patching up the capitalist system. It must go" and declaring: "We will not vote for the identical twin candidates" of Fine Gael and Fianna Fáil, after they "imposed austerity". Bríd Smith seconded the nomination. The nomination of Boyd Barrett was defeated by 9 votes to 111. As well as the 6 other AAA–PBP TDs, he also had the support of Séamus Healy of the Workers and Unemployed Action, Tommy Broughan of Independents 4 Change, and Independent TD Catherine Connolly.

At the general election in February 2020, he was again re-elected, having topped the poll.

Campaigns and policies

Domestic policy
Richard Boyd Barrett has campaigned against Ireland's bank-bail outs and the National Asset Management Agency (NAMA), organised protests, and supported initiatives such as The Right to Work Campaign. He also proposed direct investment in public enterprise and strategic industry to create jobs in areas such as renewable energy, food production, generic medicines and IT development. Boyd Barrett has organised a campaign to oppose the sale of St Michael's Hospital to private developers, led campaigns to protect public amenities in Dún Laoghaire, including the Save Our Seafront campaign against a high rise development on the site of the Dún Laoghaire baths, and he has also campaigned to prevent the acquisition of Dún Laoghaire harbour by private companies.

In a 2021 private members bill, Boyd Barrett called for the Leaving Cert to be abolished and for all students to be able to study any course of their choice regardless of exam results.

Foreign policy
Boyd Barrett helped to organise mass protests against the war in Iraq in 2003. He addressed the Dublin leg of the 20 March 2003 International Day of Action. He said that it was "almost certain" that any war would lead to between 50,000 and 100,000 deaths. He said "the complicity of the Irish Government in this murderous war through providing facilities for the US military at Shannon airport" was "an absolute disgrace" and urged people to protest in their thousands "to show this carnage is not being mounted in our names". In 2009, he supported the pro-democracy protests in Iran.

In March 2005, according to the Irish Anti-War organisation, Boyd Barrett attended the Cairo Anti-war Conference in Cairo, Egypt, focusing on American intervention in Iraq.

In 2007, he called for Ibrahim Moussawi, head of the Hezbollah-owned Al-Manar TV station, to be allowed to enter Ireland to attend a Dublin conference organised by the Irish Anti-War Movement. According to the Irish Independent, Boyd Barrett said that banning Moussawi amounted to the suppression of "free public debate in the country".

In April 2009, Boyd Barrett addressed the Al-Aqsa Festival fundraising event held at the RDS Concert Hall in Dublin. He said that Israel is "a state built on violence, oppression and apartheid" and "has no right to exist as long as it denies rights to Palestinians."

References

 

1967 births
Living people
Alumni of University College Dublin
Cusack family (Ireland)
Irish anti-war activists
Irish tax resisters
Local councillors in Dún Laoghaire–Rathdown
Members of the 31st Dáil
Members of the 32nd Dáil
Members of the 33rd Dáil
People Before Profit Alliance TDs
People from Glenageary
Socialist Workers Party (Ireland) politicians
People Before Profit–Solidarity TDs